Albireonidae is a monotypic group of extinct porpoise-like whales containing the single genus Albireo. These medium-sized, fossil dolphins are very rare and known only from temperate latitudes around the margin of the eastern North Pacific Ocean.

References

Toothed whales